In Greek mythology, Aepytus (Ancient Greek: Αἵπυτος) was the youngest son of Cresphontes the Heraclid, king of Messenia, and of Merope, the daughter of the Arcadian king Cypselus.

Mythology 
Cresphontes and his other sons were murdered during an insurrection, and Aepytus alone, who was educated in the house of his grandfather Cypselus, escaped the danger. The throne of Cresphontes was in the meantime occupied by the Heraclid Polyphontes, who also forced Merope to become his wife. When Aepytus had grown to manhood, he was enabled by the aid of Holaeas, his uncle, to return to his kingdom of Messenia, punish the murderers of his father, and put Polyphontes to death. He left a son, Glaucus, and it was from him that subsequently the kings of Messenia were called Aepytids instead of the more general name Heraclids.

Notes

References 

 Apollodorus, The Library with an English Translation by Sir James George Frazer, F.B.A., F.R.S. in 2 Volumes, Cambridge, MA, Harvard University Press; London, William Heinemann Ltd. 1921. . Online version at the Perseus Digital Library. Greek text available from the same website.
Gaius Julius Hyginus, Fabulae from The Myths of Hyginus translated and edited by Mary Grant. University of Kansas Publications in Humanistic Studies. Online version at the Topos Text Project.
 Pausanias, Description of Greece with an English Translation by W.H.S. Jones, Litt.D., and H.A. Ormerod, M.A., in 4 Volumes. Cambridge, MA, Harvard University Press; London, William Heinemann Ltd. 1918. . Online version at the Perseus Digital Library
Pausanias, Graeciae Descriptio. 3 vols. Leipzig, Teubner. 1903.  Greek text available at the Perseus Digital Library.

Princes in Greek mythology